KMCC (channel 34) is a television station licensed to Laughlin, Nevada, United States, serving as the Ion Television outlet for the Las Vegas area. It is owned and operated by the Ion Media subsidiary of the E. W. Scripps Company alongside ABC affiliate KTNV-TV (channel 13). KMCC's main transmitter is located near Dolan Springs, Arizona, with a secondary transmitter adjacent to the KTNV-TV studios on South Valley View Boulevard in Paradise, Nevada.

History
On May 14, 1996, the Federal Communications Commission (FCC) issued a construction permit to Meridian Communications Company (later Mojave Broadcasting Company) for a full power television station on UHF channel 34 to serve Lake Havasu City, Arizona. Its original call letters were to be KAUE, adopted in February 1997, but changed to KMCC a month later.

In July 1996, while preparing to build the station, Mojave Broadcasting determined that the proposed transmitter location was inadequate for a full-power television operation and that the alternate site near Oatman, Arizona, could not provide city-grade service to Lake Havasu City due to terrain. In early 1999, they requested to move the station and both the analog and digital allotments to Laughlin, Nevada, with the transmitter at the Oatman site. They later modified their proposal to specify a transmitter in Laughlin, allowing it to secure an affiliation with NBC, since the new location would not interfere with Las Vegas NBC station KVBC (channel 3, now KSNV); the children of James Rogers, chairman of KVBC owner Sunbelt Communications Company, owned Mojave Broadcasting, and Sunbelt had signed a time brokerage agreement with KMCC.

The FCC formally granted the request in June 2000 and Mojave Broadcasting began building the station in Laughlin. The FCC granted a construction permit for a digital companion channel, UHF 32, on January 15, 2002, and granted special temporary authority (STA) on April 6, 2004, to broadcast in digital at reduced power from the analog transmitter location.

The analog station signed on August 21, 2003, as a satellite of KVBC, and was granted a license on May 28, 2004. The arrangement was temporary, as before the station was licensed, Cranston II LLC had agreed to buy KMCC from Mojave Broadcasting. The sale was approved by the FCC in October 2004 and consummated in July 2005. Upon taking ownership, Cranston changed the station to Spanish-language programming from TeleFórmula, the cable news arm of Grupo Fórmula. In March 2006, equipment failure forced the station to reduce power significantly; in November, it switched to Multimedios Television.

KMCC had a construction permit to broadcast on UHF channel 32 from a transmitter location approximately  NNE of the analog transmitter location. The site, located near Dolan Springs, Arizona, is over  higher in elevation than the analog site, so while the analog station served the Mohave Valley from Bullhead City, Arizona, and Laughlin down to Needles, California, the digital station, when fully built and operational, would not only serve Laughlin and the Colorado River Valley, but most of central Mohave County, Arizona, and would reach beyond Las Vegas. , however, the station was broadcasting on STA from the analog site at 15 kW with coverage approximately that of the analog signal. Cranston filed a request to extend the STA until January 1, 2007.

On January 26, 2009, KMCC switched to Mega TV, an independent television network based in Florida. The station again changed affiliations on January 1, 2010, affiliating with VasalloVision. KMCC then became an affiliate of MundoFox (now MundoMax) when it launched on August 13, 2012. In 2015, KMCC aired a music video format 24/7 called TheCoolTV on digital channels 32.2, 32.3 with some local programming. On December 1, 2016, with the demise of MundoMax, KMCC switched to Luken Communications' The Action Channel and Heartland networks.

Entravision Communications agreed to purchase KMCC for $2.75 million on March 1, 2017; the sale created a duopoly with Univision affiliate KINC. The sale was completed on January 17, 2018. In April 2018, KMCC became an Azteca América affiliate.

On January 27, 2020, it was announced that Ion Media would purchase KMCC from Entravision for an undisclosed price. The sale was completed on April 3. On September 24, 2020, the Cincinnati-based E. W. Scripps Company (owners of ABC affiliate KTNV-TV, channel 13) announced that it would purchase Ion Media for $2.65 billion, with financing from Berkshire Hathaway.

Subchannels
The station's digital signal is multiplexed:

References

External links

Television channels and stations established in 2003
2003 establishments in Nevada
Equity Media Holdings
MCC
Ion Television affiliates
Bounce TV affiliates
Court TV affiliates
Scripps News affiliates
Defy TV affiliates
TrueReal affiliates
E. W. Scripps Company television stations